Andrei Viktorovich Trefilov; born 31 August 1969) is a Russian retired ice hockey goaltender and a sports agent. He played in the National Hockey League between 1992 and 1999 with the Calgary Flames, Buffalo Sabres, and Chicago Blackhawks. The rest of his career, which lasted from 1986 to 2006, was spent in the North American minor leagues and in Europe. 

Internationally Trefilov first played for the Soviet national team at the World Championships and 1991 Canada Cup, the Unified Team at the 1992 Winter Olympics, winning a gold medal, and then the Russian national team at several World Championships, as well as the 1998 Winter Olympics, winning a silver.

Playing career
Trefilov played several seasons in the was selected in the Soviet Championship League. He was selected in the 12th round of the 1991 NHL Entry Draft, 261st overall, by the Calgary Flames. He started his National Hockey League career in 1993 with the Calgary Flames and he went on to spend time with the Chicago Blackhawks, and Buffalo Sabres. He was one of the goaltenders for the Unified Team that won the gold medal at the 1992 Winter Olympics. He also played for Russia in two Olympic Winter Games. His last club was the DEG Metro Stars of the Deutsche Eishockey Liga in Germany, where he played until 2006.

As a member of the IHL's Detroit Vipers, Trefilov shared the James Norris Memorial Trophy with Kevin Weekes for allowing the fewest goals in the IHL in 1999 and won the Norman R. "Bud" Poile Trophy as the IHL playoff most valuable player in 2000 with the Chicago Wolves. He was also the starting goaltender for the Buffalo Sabres in the last game at Buffalo Memorial Auditorium, on 14 April 1996.

Career statistics

Regular season and playoffs

International

References

External links 
 

1969 births
Living people
Ak Bars Kazan players
Buffalo Sabres players
Calgary Flames draft picks
Calgary Flames players
Chicago Blackhawks players
Chicago Wolves (IHL) players
DEG Metro Stars players
Dizel Penza players
Detroit Vipers players
Düsseldorfer EG players
HC Dynamo Moscow players
Ice hockey players at the 1992 Winter Olympics
Ice hockey players at the 1998 Winter Olympics
Indianapolis Ice players
Medalists at the 1992 Winter Olympics
Medalists at the 1998 Winter Olympics
Olympic gold medalists for the Unified Team
Olympic ice hockey players of Russia
Olympic ice hockey players of the Unified Team
Olympic silver medalists for Russia
Soviet ice hockey goaltenders
Ice hockey people from Moscow
Rochester Americans players
Russian ice hockey goaltenders
Saint John Flames players
Salt Lake Golden Eagles (IHL) players
Olympic medalists in ice hockey